Dronfield is a town in Derbyshire, England.

Dronfield may also refer to:

Places and organisations associated with the town
 Dronfield Henry Fanshawe School
 Dronfield Manor, a Grade II listed building
 Dronfield railway station
 Dronfield Town F.C.
 Dronfield Woodhouse, a district of Dronfield

People
 William Dronfield (1826-1894), British trade unionist

Other
 Dronfield House, St Peter's School, York

See also